Hope is an optimistic state of mind that is based on an expectation of positive outcomes with respect to events and circumstances in one's life or the world at large.
As a verb, its definitions include: "expect with confidence" and "to cherish a desire with anticipation".

Among its opposites are dejection, hopelessness, and despair.

In psychology

Professor of Psychology Barbara Fredrickson argues that hope comes into its own when crisis looms, opening us to new creative possibilities. Frederickson argues that with great need comes an unusually wide range of ideas, as well as such positive emotions as happiness and joy, courage, and empowerment, drawn from four different areas of one's self: from a cognitive, psychological, social, or physical perspective. Hopeful people are "like the little engine that could, [because] they keep telling themselves "I think I can, I think I can". Such positive thinking bears fruit when based on a realistic sense of optimism, not on a naive "false hope".

The psychologist Charles R. Snyder linked hope to the existence of a goal, combined with a determined plan for reaching that goal: Alfred Adler had similarly argued for the centrality of goal-seeking in human psychology, as too had philosophical anthropologists like Ernst Bloch. Snyder also stressed the link between hope and mental willpower, as well as the need for realistic perception of goals, arguing that the difference between hope and optimism was that the former included practical pathways to an improved future. D. W. Winnicott saw a child's antisocial behavior as expressing an unconscious hope for management by the wider society, when containment within the immediate family had failed. Object relations theory similarly sees the analytic transference as motivated in part by an unconscious hope that past conflicts and traumas can be dealt with anew.

Hope theory
As a specialist in positive psychology, Snyder studied how hope and forgiveness can impact several aspects of life such as health, work, education, and personal meaning. He postulated that there are three main things that make up hopeful thinking:

 Goals – Approaching life in a goal-oriented way.
 Pathways – Finding different ways to achieve your goals.
 Agency – Believing that you can instigate change and achieve these goals.

In other words, hope was defined as the perceived capability to derive pathways to desired goals and motivate oneself via agency thinking to use those pathways.

Snyder argues that individuals who are able to realize these three components and develop a belief in their ability are hopeful people who can establish clear goals, imagine multiple workable pathways toward those goals, and persevere, even when obstacles get in their way. 

Snyder proposed a "Hope Scale" which considered that a person's determination to achieve their goal is their measured hope. Snyder differentiates between adult-measured hope and child-measured hope. The Adult Hope Scale by Snyder contains 12 questions; 4 measuring 'pathways thinking', 4 measuring 'agency thinking', and 4 that are simply fillers. Each subject responds to each question using an 8-point scale. Fibel and Hale measure hope by combining Snyder's Hope Scale with their own Generalized Expectancy for Success Scale (GESS) to empirically measure hope. Snyder regarded that psychotherapy can help focus attention on one's goals, drawing on tacit knowledge of how to reach them. Similarly, there is an outlook and a grasp of reality to hope, distinguishing No Hope, Lost Hope, False Hope and Real Hope, which differ in terms of viewpoint and realism.

Contemporary philosopher Richard Rorty understands hope as more than goal setting, rather as a metanarrative, a story that serves as a promise or reason for expecting a better future. Rorty as postmodernist believes past meta–narratives, including the Christian story, utilitarianism, and Marxism have proved false hopes; that theory cannot offer social hope; and that liberal man must learn to live without a consensual theory of social hope. Rorty says a new document of promise is needed for social hope to exist again.

In healthcare

Major theories 
Of the countless models that examine the importance of hope in an individual's life, two major theories have gained a significant amount of recognition in the field of psychology. One of these theories, developed by Charles R. Snyder, argues that hope should be viewed as a cognitive skill that demonstrates an individual's ability to maintain drive in the pursuit of a particular goal. This model reasons that an individual's ability to be hopeful depends on two types of thinking: agency thinking and pathway thinking. Agency thinking refers to an individual's determination to achieve their goals despite possible obstacles, while pathway thinking refers to the ways in which an individual believes they can achieve these personal goals.

Snyder's theory uses hope as a mechanism that is most often seen in psychotherapy. In these instances, the therapist helps their client overcome barriers that have prevented them from achieving goals. The therapist would then help the client set realistic and relevant personal goals (i.e. "I am going to find something I am passionate about and that makes me feel good about myself"), and would help them remain hopeful of their ability to achieve these goals, and suggest the correct pathways to do so.

Whereas Snyder's theory focuses on hope as a mechanism to overcome an individual's lack of motivation to achieve goals, the other major theory developed by Kaye A. Herth deals more specifically with an individual's future goals as they relate to coping with illnesses. Herth views hope as "a motivational and cognitive attribute that is theoretically necessary to initiate and sustain action toward goal attainment". Establishing realistic and attainable goals in this situation is more difficult, as the individual most likely does not have direct control over the future of their health. Instead, Herth suggests that the goals should be concerned with how the individual is going to personally deal with the illness—"Instead of drinking to ease the pain of my illness, I am going to surround myself with friends and family".

While the nature of the goals in Snyder's model differ with those in Herth's model, they both view hope as a way to maintain personal motivation, which ultimately will result in a greater sense of optimism.

Major empirical findings 
Hope, and more specifically, particularized hope, has been shown to be an important part of the recovery process from illness; it has strong psychological benefits for patients, helping them to cope more effectively with their disease. For example, hope motivates people to pursue healthy behaviors for recovery, such as eating fruits and vegetables, quitting smoking, and engaging in regular physical activity. This not only helps to enhance people's recovery from illnesses but also helps prevent illness from developing in the first place. Patients who maintain high levels of hope have an improved prognosis for life-threatening illness and an enhanced quality of life. Belief and expectation, which are key elements of hope, block pain in patients suffering from chronic illness by releasing endorphins and mimicking the effects of morphine. Consequently, through this process, belief and expectation can set off a chain reaction in the body that can make recovery from chronic illness more likely. This chain reaction is especially evident with studies demonstrating the placebo effect, a situation when hope is the only variable aiding in these patients’ recovery.

Overall, studies have demonstrated that maintaining a sense of hope during a period of recovery from illness is beneficial. A sense of hopelessness during the recovery period has, in many instances, resulted in adverse health conditions for the patient (i.e. depression and anxiety following the recovery process). Additionally, having a greater amount of hope before and during cognitive therapy has led to decreased PTSD-related depression symptoms in war veterans. Hope has also been found to be associated with more positive perceptions of subjective health. However, reviews of research literature have noted that the connections between hope and symptom severity in other mental health disorders are less clear, such as in cases of individuals with schizophrenia.

Hope is a powerful protector against chronic or life-threatening illnesses. A person’s hope (even when facing an illness that will likely end their life) can be helpful by finding joy or comfort. It can be created and focused on achieving life goals, such as meeting grandchildren or attending a child’s wedding. Hope can be an opportunity for us to process and go through events, that can be traumatic. A setback in life, an accident, or our own final months of living can be times when hope is comfort and serves as a pathway from one stage to the next.

Applications 
The inclusion of hope in treatment programs has potential in both physical and mental health settings. Hope as a mechanism for improved treatment has been studied in the contexts of PTSD, chronic physical illness, and terminal illness, among other disorders and ailments. Within mental health practice, clinicians have suggested using hope interventions as a supplement to more traditional cognitive behavioral therapies. In terms of support for physical illness, research suggests that hope can encourage the release of endorphins and enkephalins, which help to block pain.

Impediments 
There are two main arguments based on judgment against those who are advocates of using hope to help treat severe illnesses. The first of which is that if physicians have too much hope, they may aggressively treat the patient. The physician will hold on to a small shred of hope that the patient may get better. Thus, this causes them to try methods that are costly and may have many side effects. One physician noted that she regretted having hope for her patient; it resulted in her patient suffering through three more years of pain that the patient would not have endured if the physician had realized recovery was unfeasible.

The second argument is the division between hope and wishing. Those that are hopeful are actively trying to investigate the best path of action while taking into consideration the obstacles. Research has shown though that many of those who have "hope" are wishfully thinking and passively going through the motions, as if they are in denial about their actual circumstances. Being in denial and having too much hope may negatively impact both the patient and the physician.

Benefits 
The impact that hope can have on a patient's recovery process is strongly supported through both empirical research and theoretical approaches. However, reviews of literature also maintain that more longitudinal and methodologically sound research is needed to establish which hope interventions are actually the most effective, and in what setting (i.e. chronic illness vs. terminal illness).

In culture 
In the matter of globalization, hope is focused on economic and social empowerment.

Focusing on parts of Asia, hope has taken on a secular or materialistic form in relation to the pursuit of economic growth. Primary examples are the rise of the economies of China and India, correlating with the notion of Chindia. A secondary relevant example is the increased use of contemporary architecture in rising economies, such as the building of the Shanghai World Financial Center, Burj Khalifa and Taipei 101, which has given rise to a prevailing hope within the countries of origin. In chaotic environments hope is transcended without cultural boundaries, Syrian refugee children are supported by UNESCO's education project through creative education and psycho-social assistance. Other inter-cultural support for instilling hope involve food culture, disengaging refugees from trauma through immersing them in their rich cultural past.

In literature 

A classic reference to hope which has entered modern language is the concept that "Hope springs eternal" taken from Alexander Pope's Essay on Man, the phrase reading "Hope springs eternal in the human breast, Man never is, but always to be blest:" Another popular reference, "Hope is the thing with feathers," is from a poem by Emily Dickinson.

Hope can be used as an artistic plot device and is often a motivating force for change in dynamic characters. A commonly understood reference from western popular culture is the subtitle "A New Hope" from the original first installment (now considered Episode IV) in the Star Wars science fiction space opera. The subtitle refers to one of the lead characters, Luke Skywalker, who is expected in the future to allow good to triumph over evil within the plot of the films.

The swallow has been a symbol of hope, in Aesop's fables and numerous other historic literature. It symbolizes hope, in part because it is among the first birds to appear at the end of winter and the start of spring. Other symbols of hope include the anchor and the dove.

Nietzsche took a contrarian but coherent view of hope:-

In mythology 
Elpis (Hope) appears in ancient Greek mythology with the story of Zeus and Prometheus. Prometheus stole fire from the god Zeus, which infuriated the supreme god. In turn, Zeus created a box that contained all manners of evil, unbeknownst to the receiver of the box. Pandora opened the box after being warned not to, and unleashed a multitude of harmful spirits that inflicted plagues, diseases, and illnesses on mankind. Spirits of greed, envy, hatred, mistrust, sorrow, anger, revenge, lust, and despair scattered far and wide looking for humans to torment. Inside the box, however, there was also an unreleased healing spirit named Hope. From ancient times, people have recognized that a spirit of hope had the power to heal afflictions and helps them bear times of great suffering, illnesses, disasters, loss, and pain caused by the malevolent spirits and events. In Hesiod's Works and Days, the personification of hope is named Elpis.

Norse mythology however considered Hope (Vön) to be the slobber dripping from the mouth of Fenris Wolf: their concept of courage rated most highly a cheerful bravery in the absence of hope.

In religion 
Hope is a key concept in most major world religions, often signifying the "hoper" believes an individual or a collective group will reach a concept of heaven. Depending on the religion, hope can be seen as a prerequisite for and/or byproduct of spiritual attainment.

Judaism
The Jewish Encyclopedia notes "tiḳwah" (תקווה) and "seber" as terms for hope, adding that "miḳweh" and "kislah" denote the related concept of "trust" and that "toḥelet" signifies "expectation".

Christianity 

Hope is one of the three theological virtues of the Christian religion, alongside faith and love. "Hope" in the Holy Bible means "a strong and confident expectation" of future reward (see Titus 1:2). In modern terms, hope is akin to trust and a confident expectation". Paul the Apostle argued that Christ was a source of hope for Christians: "For in this hope we have been saved" (see Romans 8:24).

According to the Holman Bible Dictionary, hope is a "[t]rustful expectation...the anticipation of a favorable outcome under God's guidance." In The Pilgrim's Progress, it is Hopeful who comforts Christian in Doubting Castle; while conversely at the entrance to Dante's Hell were the words, "Lay down all hope, you that go in by me".

Hinduism 
In historic literature of Hinduism, hope is referred to with Pratidhi (Sanskrit: प्रतिधी), or Apêksh (Sanskrit: अपेक्ष). It is discussed with the concepts of desire and wish. In Vedic philosophy, karma was linked to ritual sacrifices (yajna), hope and success linked to correct performance of these rituals. In Vishnu Smriti, the image of hope, morals and work is represented as the virtuous man who rides in a chariot directed by his hopeful mind to his desired wishes, drawn by his five senses, who keeps the chariot on the path of the virtuous, and thus is not distracted by the wrongs such as wrath, greed, and other vices.

In the centuries that followed, the concept of karma changed from sacramental rituals to actual human action that builds and serves society and human existence–a philosophy epitomized in the Bhagavad Gita. Hope, in the structure of beliefs and motivations, is a long-term karmic concept. In Hindu belief, actions have consequences, and while one's effort and work may or may not bear near term fruits, it will serve the good, that the journey of one's diligent efforts (karma) and how one pursues the journey, sooner or later leads to bliss and moksha.

See also

References

Further reading 
 Averill, James R. Rules of hope. Springer-Verlag, 1990.
 Miceli, Maria and Cristiano Castelfranchi. "Hope: The Power of Wish and Possibility" in Theory Psychology. April 2010 vol. 20 no. 2 251–276.
 Kierkegaard, Søren A. The Sickness Unto Death. Princeton University Press, 1995.
 Snyder, C. R. Handbook of hope: theory, measures, & applications. Academic [Press], 2000.
 Stout, Larry. Ideal Leadership: Time for a Change. Destiny Image, 2006

Hope
Emotions
Propositional attitudes